Matt Kohn (born September 27, 1981) is an American football coach and former player.  He is the head football coach at Siena Heights University.  Kohn played as a quarterback for two seasons in the Arena Football League with the Nashville Kats and Kansas City Brigade. He played college football at the University of Indianapolis. He was also a member of the Ohio Valley Greyhounds of United Indoor Football.

Early years
Kohn played high school football at Adrian High School in Adrian, Michigan. The Maples finished 11–1 his senior year and the school's first ever 9-0 regular season record. He finished the year throwing for 2,294 yards and 29 TDs, adding 290 yards and eight TDs on the ground. He was named to the Detroit Free Press All-State Dream Team. He was the starting quarterback for the West team in the Michigan High School Coaches Association All-Star football game. He also played basketball being named one of the top 100 players in the state before the start of his senior season by the Detroit Free Press. He was named 2nd team all-state.

College career
Kohn played for the Indianapolis Greyhounds of the University of Indianapolis. In 2003, he set school records for passing attempts, completions, yards, and TDs when he completed 239 passes on 290 attempts for 3,314 yards and 21 TDs. He was a nominee for the Harlon Hill Trophy in 2003. He was named 2nd team all-conference in 2003 and honorable mention in 2002. Upon graduation, he set school records for career passing attempts(1,110), completions(652), passing yards(8,514), and TDs(55).

College statistics

Professional career
Kohn played for the Ohio Valley Greyhounds of United Indoor Football (UIF) in 2006. He was named the UIF Offensive Player of the Year.

Kohn signed with the Nashville Kats on October 13, 2006. He played for the Kansas City Brigade in 2008.

AFL statistics

Stats from ArenaFan:

Coaching career
Kohn was quarterbacks coach at the University of Indianapolis from 2006 to 2008. He has since served as an assistant head coach, defensive coordinator and inside linebackers coach at Siena Heights University. In May 2016, he was named the interim head coach of the Siena Heights Saints for the 2016 season. On December 6, 2016, it was announced that Kohn would continue as the team's permanent head coach.

Head coaching record

References

External links
 Siena Heights profile
 Just Sports Stats

Living people
1981 births
American football quarterbacks
Indianapolis Greyhounds football coaches
Indianapolis Greyhounds football players
Kansas City Brigade players
Nashville Kats players
Siena Heights Saints football coaches
People from Adrian, Michigan
Players of American football from Michigan
Ohio Valley Greyhounds players